Beltrán is a Spanish-Italian surname (or given male name) of initially italian origin with the first record of the surname found in Bologna, Italy at the University of Bologna. Centuries later, the surname primarily came to be known as a Spanish Surname, most notably in the Catalan region of Spain and southern France. It derives from the Germanic words berht ("bright") and hramn ("raven"). It shares this same Germanic origin with Bertrand (French) and Bertram (German). Other variations of surnames derived from Beltrán include Beltrami, Beltrame, Beltrano, Beltrandi, Beltrando, Beltrand, Bertrami, Bertram, Bertrandi, Bertrando, Beltramelli, Bertrandi, Beltramini, Bertramelli, Bertamin, Tramell and many more. In non-Spanish speaking countries, the accent is usually omitted as Beltran.

Given name
 Prince Beltran of Bulgaria, the second son of Kardam of Saxe-Coburg and grandson of Simeon II of Bulgaria
 Beltrán Osorio, Spanish aristocrat and jockey known as the "Iron Duke" of Alburquerque
 Beltrán de la Cueva, Spanish nobleman, suspected to be the father of Joanna "la Beltraneja", daughter of Henry IV of Castille
 Beltrán Pérez, Dominican baseball pitcher

Surname

Fernando Beltran soccer player
Club deportivo Guadalajara
 Alfredo Beltrán Leyva (born 1971), Mexican drug lord
 Álvaro Beltrán (born 1978), Mexican racquetball player
 Carlos Beltrán (born 1977), Puerto Rican baseball outfielder
 Carlos Beltrán (musician) (born 1956), Mexican multi-keyboard player
 Crispin Beltran (1933–2008), Filipino politician and labour organizer
 Daima Beltrán (born 1972), Cuban judoka
 Eusebius J. Beltran (born 1934), U.S. Catholic bishop
 Francis Beltrán (born 1979), Dominican baseball pitcher
 Ileana Beltrán (born 1971), Cuban judoka
 Joey Beltran (born 1981), American mixed martial artist
 Joaquín Beltrán (born 1977), Mexican football defender
José Miguel Arenas Beltrán, or Valtònyc  (born 1993), Spanish rapper
 Luis Beltrán (1526–1581), Valencian priest, patron saint of Colombia
 Manuel Beltrán (born 1971), Spanish road cyclist
 Manuela Beltrán (fl. 1780), Colombian woman who organized a peasant revolt against excess taxation
 Monica Beltran (born 1985), U.S. soldier
 Perla Beltrán (born 1986), Mexican beauty queen 
 Robert Beltran (born 1953), Mexican American actor
 Salvador Beltrán (born 1992), Spanish singer
 Sister Sponsa Beltran (1925-2016), American nun
 Tito Beltrán (born 1965), Chilean tenor
 Yurizan Beltran, an American pornographic actress
 Alejandro Beltran Quezada, Mexican billionaire entrepreneur & businessman.

Places
 Beltrán, Cundinamarca, a town in Colombia
 Beltran (volcano), a volcano in Argentina

References

"Beltrán Surname." House of Names, houseofnames.com/fc.asp?s=Beltrán. (Accessed on [02/06/23])
"Beltrán Surname." House of Names, houseofnames.com/fc.asp?s=Beltrán. (Accessed on [02/06/23])

Spanish-language surnames